Juttadinteria kovisimontana is a species of plant in the family Aizoaceae. It is endemic to Namibia.  Its natural habitat is cold desert.

References

Flora of Namibia
kovisimonta
Vulnerable plants
Taxonomy articles created by Polbot